William Henry Timothy Newburn (born 4 July 1959) is an academic, specialising in criminology and policing.

Career
He was president of the British Society of Criminology from 2005–2008, director of the Mannheim Centre for Criminology from 2003-2008 and is currently head of the Department of Social Policy at the London School of Economics and Political Science. From 1997, he was Director of the Public Policy Research Unit at Goldsmiths College and has previously worked at the Policy Studies Institute, the National Institute for Social Work, the Home Office and Leicester University.

He has published widely on crime and the police, his publications include Criminology (2007) and the Handbook of Policing (2008). He has also written for The Independent.

In 2017, Newburn published a third edition of Criminology, a follow up to his 2013 Second Edition. It is 1143 pages long and provides an in-depth analysis of crime and criminology, as well as the theories and concepts related to it.

References

Living people
1959 births
British criminologists